William Whitehurst (born 10 June 1959) is an English retired professional footballer active during the 1980s and 1990s. Whitehurst's robust style of play attracted much notoriety and he is considered by many to have been the hardest player to have played the game.

Career
Whitehurst was born in Thurnscoe, West Riding of Yorkshire and started his career playing for a number of semi-professional teams in South Yorkshire, Retford Town, Bridlington Trinity and Mexborough Town, whilst also working for the local council as a bricklayer. He eventually made the move into the professional ranks with Hull City in 1980 signing for a £2,000 fee. He initially struggled with the demands of the professional game but eventually sealed his place as one of the most popular players to have ever played for the club. He helped the Tigers win promotion in 1982–83 and 1984–85 with Whitehurst scoring a career best of 24 goals.

His upturn in form had not gone un-noticed and he joined Newcastle United in 1985 as their then record signing for £232,000. Despite playing in a side containing Peter Beardsley and Paul Gascoigne, the move did not work out and Whitehurst failed to score in his first 11 appearances for the club. A spat with his own supporters signalled the end of his career on Tyneside and after playing only 28 league games he was transferred to Oxford United in 1986. However the move there was similarly short-lived, and Whitehurst left after a clash with assistant manager Ray Graydon.

He then joined Reading in February 1988 scoring eight goals in 19 matches for the Royals he left for Sunderland scoring three in 18 matches before making a return to Hull City. Whitehurst spent a year and a half back at Boothferry Park before joining Sheffield United. Whitehurst helped the Blades gain promotion in 1989–90 and spent a short time out on loan at Stoke City in 1990–91 where he played in five matches. Whitehurst ended his professional career at Doncaster Rovers during which time he also played on loan for Crewe Alexandra.

However, Whitehurst's hard man persona and colourful off field antics ensured he always caused a reaction and cemented his place as something of a cult figure within the game. Whitehurst ended his playing days abroad, playing in Northern Ireland, Australia and in Hong Kong with South China (1992–93) before a long-standing knee injury caused his retirement in 1993.

After football
Since leaving the game Whitehurst has trained greyhounds, ran several public houses in his native South Yorkshire and worked in the building trade and in the stores at BP Saltend and Drax Power Station. In 2008, he was found guilty of benefit fraud and given a suspended prison sentence.

Career statistics

A.  The "Other" column constitutes appearances and goals in the Football League Group Cup, Football League Trophy, Full Members Cup.

Honours
 Hull City 
 Football League Fourth Division runner-up: 1982–83
 Football League Third Division third-place promotion: 1984–85

 Sheffield United
 Football League Second Division runner-up: 1989–90

References

External links
 Interview with Billy Whitehurst on Talksport

1959 births
Living people
People from Thurnscoe
English footballers
Association football forwards
Retford Town F.C. players
Bridlington Trinity F.C. players
Mexborough Town F.C. players
Hull City A.F.C. players
Newcastle United F.C. players
Oxford United F.C. players
Reading F.C. players
Sunderland A.F.C. players
Sheffield United F.C. players
Stoke City F.C. players
Doncaster Rovers F.C. players
Crewe Alexandra F.C. players
St George FC players
Hatfield Main F.C. players
Kettering Town F.C. players
Goole Town F.C. players
Stafford Rangers F.C. players
Mossley A.F.C. players
Glentoran F.C. players
South China AA players
Sun Hei SC players
Frickley Athletic F.C. players
English Football League players
English expatriate footballers
Expatriate footballers in Hong Kong
English expatriate sportspeople in Hong Kong